Salzburg is an Ortsgemeinde – a community belonging to a Verbandsgemeinde – in the Westerwaldkreis in Rhineland-Palatinate, Germany.

Geography

The community lies in the Westerwald between Siegen and Limburg. Salzburg belongs to the Verbandsgemeinde of Rennerod, a kind of collective municipality. Its seat is in the like-named town.

History
About 1300, Salzburg had its first documentary mention as Salberg.

Politics

The municipal council is made up of 6 council members who were elected in a majority vote in a municipal election on 13 June 2004.

Economy and infrastructure

Right near the community, two Bundesstraßen, 54 linking Limburg an der Lahn with Siegen, and 414 leading from Hohenroth to Hachenburg cross each other. The nearest Autobahn interchange is Herborn on the A 45 (Dortmund–Hanau), some 20 km away. The nearest InterCityExpress stop is the railway station at Montabaur on the Cologne-Frankfurt high-speed rail line.

References

External links
Salzburg in the collective municipality’s Web pages 

Westerwaldkreis